Ranald is an English and Scots masculine given name. It is an Anglicised form of the Scottish Gaelic name Raghnall. A short form of Ranald is Ran.

Notable persons
Ranald Graham (1941–2010), Scottish writer, television director and producer
Ranald Leask, British journalist
Ranald MacDonald (bishop) (1756–1832), Scottish Roman Catholic bishop
Ranald George Macdonald (1788–1873), Scottish clan chief and Member of British Parliament
Ranald MacDonald (1824–1894), English language teacher in Japan
Ranald Roderick Macdonald (1945–2007), British mathematician and psychologist
Ranald MacDougall (1915–1973), American screenwriter
Ranald S. Mackenzie (1840–1889), United States Army officer and general during the Civil War
Ranald Sutherland, Lord Sutherland (born 1932), Scottish judge

Fictional characters
Ranald Bannerman from Ranald Bannerman's Boyhood, a novel by George MacDonald

See also

Citations

References

English-language masculine given names
Scottish masculine given names